Johannes ("George") Du Rand (born 16 October 1982) is a South African swimmer. As of 2008, he is the African and South African record holder in the men's long course 200 meter backstroke. He is a member of South Africa's 2008 Olympic team.

He competed in the United States for the University of Tennessee.

Among other events, he has swum at the:
2006 Commonwealth Games
2007 World Championships
2008 Short Course Worlds

See also
 World record progression 200 metres backstroke

References

External links
 2006 Commonwealth Games bio

South African male swimmers
Olympic swimmers of South Africa
Swimmers at the 2008 Summer Olympics
Living people
1982 births
Sportspeople from Bloemfontein
World record setters in swimming
Swimmers at the 2006 Commonwealth Games
Commonwealth Games silver medallists for South Africa
Tennessee Volunteers men's swimmers
University of Tennessee alumni
Male backstroke swimmers
Commonwealth Games medallists in swimming
African Games silver medalists for South Africa
African Games medalists in swimming
Competitors at the 1999 All-Africa Games
Medallists at the 2006 Commonwealth Games